Ross Stuart Tong (born 21 April 1961) is a former New Zealand rower who won an Olympic bronze medal at the 1984 Summer Olympics in Los Angeles.

Tong was born in 1961 in Wanganui, New Zealand. His father, Allan Tong, was an Olympic rower in 1956. Along with Don Symon, Kevin Lawton, Barrie Mabbott and Brett Hollister (cox), Tong Jr. won the bronze medal in the coxed four in 1984. He is listed as New Zealand Olympian athlete number 515 by the New Zealand Olympic Committee.

Tong is a former police officer. For some time, he coached rowing at King's College in Auckland. Tong is now Director of Sport at St John's College, Hamilton.

References

External links
 

1961 births
Living people
New Zealand male rowers
Olympic rowers of New Zealand
Olympic bronze medalists for New Zealand
Rowers at the 1984 Summer Olympics
Olympic medalists in rowing
Medalists at the 1984 Summer Olympics
Rowers from Whanganui